The Central Station is a station on Line 1 of the Monterrey Metro. It is located in the Madero Avenue in the Monterrey Centre. This station is located in the Colon Avenue in the northeast side of the Monterrey Centre. The station was opened on 25 April 1991 as part of the inaugural section of Line 1, going from San Bernabé to Exposición.

This station serves the northwest side of the downtown area and also the Monterrey Bus Depot (Central de Autobuses). It is accessible for people with disabilities.

This station is named after the Bus Depot nearby, and its logo represents a couple of buses.

References

Metrorrey stations
Railway stations opened in 1991
1991 establishments in Mexico